Guzik (also Romanized as Gūzīk) is a village in Shepiran Rural District, Kuhsar District, Salmas County, West Azerbaijan Province, Iran. At the 2006 census, its population was 286, in 42 families.

References 

Populated places in Salmas County